The Jakarta Special Capital Region is administratively equal to a province with special status as the capital of Indonesia. Instead of a mayor, the executive head of Jakarta is a governor. The governor of Jakarta is an elected politician who, along with the vice governor and 106 members of the Regional People's Representative Council (DPRD), is accountable for the strategic government of the city of Jakarta.

Background
Governing system of Jakarta has changed throughout its history. On March 5, 1942, Japanese occupied Batavia from the Dutch control and the city was named Jakarta , in accordance with the special status that was assigned to the city). After the collapse of Japan, Indonesian nationalists who declared independence on August 17, 1945, the government of Jakarta City was changed from the Japanese  into the Jakarta National Administration in September 1945. After the war, the Dutch name Batavia was internationally recognized until full Indonesian independence was achieved on December 27, 1949 and Jakarta was officially proclaimed the national capital of Indonesia. Based on the Act No. 5 of 1974 relating to the Fundamentals of Regional Government, Jakarta was confirmed as the capital of Indonesia and one of Indonesia's 26 provinces.

Elections
This first government was held by a mayor until the end of 1960, when the office was changed to that of a governor. The last mayor of Jakarta was Sudiro, until he was replaced by Dr Sumarno as governor of the province. In August 2007, Jakarta held its first ever election to choose a governor, whereas previously the city's governors were elected by members of DPRD. The poll is part of a country-wide decentralisation drive, allowing for direct local elections in several areas. Elections for governor and deputy governor are held for a fixed five-year term.

Most recent election

The most recent election was held in Jakarta on 15 February 2017. There were 3 contesting pairs in that election, but no one obtained 50% of the vote. As per law, a runoff election was held between the top two pairs on 19 April 2017. The official results of the election is Anies Baswedan - Sandiaga Uno won the election with 57.96% of vote defeating Basuki Tjahaja Purnama - Djarot Saiful Hidayat, who got 42.04% of the vote.

List of governors 
Below is a list of Mayors and Governors who have held office in the regional government district of Batavia in the Dutch East Indies until its transformation to Jakarta in Indonesia from the formation of the office in 1916.

Note: Italic denotes acting mayor/governor

Mayor of Batavia (1916–1942) 
The Dutch East Indies government began to appoint Mayors of Batavia in 1916, previously the office was held by a Resident Assistant from 1905. There are total of five Burgermeester served before the Japanese invasion in 1942.

Mayor of Special City of Jakarta (1942–1945)
Prior to the appointment of tokubetsu-shichō, the Japanese appointed Baginda Dahlan Abdullah as the acting tokubetsu-shichō.

Republican Mayor of Jakarta (1945–1947) 
After the Indonesian Independence was proclaimed on 17 August 1945, the power transfer of the city was handed over from Japan to Indonesia on 19 September 1945. Following the power transfer, President of Indonesia appointed Suwirjo as the Mayor of Jakarta on 23 September 1945. Suwirjo ended him term after being arrested by the Dutch forces on 21 July 1947, following the Operation Product that occupied the town.

Dutch Mayors of Jakarta/Batavia (1946–1950) 
Following the Dutch return to Jakarta in early 1946, the Dutch civil administration, NICA, appointed the Archibald Bogaardt as the acting mayor of Batavia. Bogaardt had been the mayor of Batavia previously in 1941, and lost his power to the Japanese in 1942. The Dutch appointed Bogaardt in a shadow government and referred the de facto major, Suwiryo, as republikeinse burgemeester. Bogaardt's successor, E. M. Stok, finally gained de facto control after the Dutch occupied the city in Operation Product on 21 July 1947.

There were four mayors of the city during this period, but only one was recognized as a definitive mayor, while the rest was referred as waarnemend burgemeester (acting mayor).

Governor of the Federal Region of Batavia (1948–1950) 
The formation of the Federal Region of Batavia was announced with the Staatsblad No. 63 in June 1948. The federal region was given an autonomous status in the territory of the State of Pasundan. The governor of the region, Hilman Djajadiningrat, was appointed on 2 November 1948.

Mayors of Djakarta (1950–1958) 
After the return of Jakarta to Indonesia, the Federal Territory of Batavia was abolished. Hilman Djajadiningrat, the former governor, and Sastromoeljono, the former mayor, handed over their mandate to Suwiryo on 30 March 1950.

Governors of Djakarta/Jakarta

See also

 Timeline of Jakarta

Notes

References

Jakarta
Governors